The Wagon Mound is a butte that was a major landmark for pioneers along the Cimarron Cutoff of the Old Santa Fe Trail, a well-known settlement route connecting St. Louis, Missouri and Santa Fe, New Mexico. It is located just east of Wagon Mound, New Mexico, a village named after the butte. The butte is a designated National Historic Landmark, along with Santa Clara Canyon, a site just northwest of the village where travelers on the trail frequently camped and took on water.

Description and history
New Mexico State Road 120 runs eastward from the village of Wagon Mound to the north of the mesa, while New Mexico State Road 271 runs southeasterly from the village to its south and west. The village is located directly west of the mesa, with two small mesas, known as the Pilot Knobs, to its west. Wagon Mound is readily visible from the Rabbit Ears, the major landmark further east on the trail.

Wagon Mound was an important landmark on the Cimarron Cutoff branch of the Santa Fe Trail for several reasons. First, it was the last major landmark before reaching Santa Fe, signalling the approaching end of the journey to westbound travelers. It also served as a cautionary point, because the topography of Santa Clara Canyon made groups camping there vulnerable to attacks by hostile Native Americans, with one notably large attack occurring in 1850. The route was heavily used between about 1822 and the American Civil War. Usage declined with the advent of the railroad (which followed the Santa Fe Trail route in this area) in the 1870s.

See also

National Register of Historic Places listings in Mora County, New Mexico
List of National Historic Landmarks in New Mexico

References

External links

Photo of Wagon Mound
Another photo

National Historic Landmarks in New Mexico
Protected areas of Mora County, New Mexico
History of Mora County, New Mexico
Natural features on the National Register of Historic Places in New Mexico
New Mexico State Register of Cultural Properties
National Register of Historic Places in Mora County, New Mexico